iMatchative is the parent company of the financial technology product, AltX. The company was founded in 2012 by Sam Hocking. Company is no longer trading.

References

External links
Imatchative.com (no longer valid)

Analytics
Companies based in San Francisco